Brooklynati is a studio album by American hip hop group Tanya Morgan. It was released by Interdependent Media and iM Culture on May 12, 2009. It is based on the creation of a fictitious city combining elements from both Cincinnati, Ohio and Brooklyn, New York. To promote the album, the group created a  multimedia campaign with a city website including a digital city map, video newscasts and other Brooklynati themes.

Concept
The album contains a mixture of hip hop songs, and spoken interludes which tell stories relating to the fictional city of Brooklynati. These interludes feature both fictional characters from the city, such as DJ Jurx, the proprietor of Brooklynati’s only record store, as well as real radio personalities, such as Miss Info of New York’s Hot 97, who add a smattering of radio chatter on the more mundane aspects of life in Brooklynati.

In promotion of the album, the band has also created several “Brooklynati Public Access” spots which have appeared on YouTube. These videos include depictions of a typical day in Brooklynati by each member of Tanya Morgan, as well as a music video for the Brooklynati-based 90’s hip-hop group, the Hardcore Gentlemen, who make a brief musical appearance on the record.

Critical reception
At Metacritic, which assigns a weighted average score out of 100 to reviews from mainstream critics, Brooklynati received an average score of 79% based on 8 reviews, indicating "generally favorable reviews".

Track listing

References

External links
 

2009 albums
Albums produced by Symbolyc One